Pacifigeron is a genus of flowering plants belonging to the family Asteraceae.

Its native range is Southern Central Pacific.

Species
Species:
 Pacifigeron indivisus Saldivia 
 Pacifigeron rapensis (F.Br.) G.L.Nesom

References

Astereae
Asteraceae genera